William de Ros, Lord of Helmsley, was an English noble. He was the eldest son of Robert de Ros and Isabella Mac William.

With his father he opposed King John of England, during the First Barons War between 1215 and 1217. Both he and his father were excommunicated during the rebellion. William was captured during the battle of Lincoln on 19 May 1217 and became a prisoner, before paying 20 marks to be released into his fathers care in October 1217.

He was buried in Kirkham Priory,
Kirkham, North Yorkshire, England.

Marriage and issue
He married Lucy FitzPeter, the daughter of Peter FitzHerbert and Alice FitzRoger, they are known to have had the following issue:
Robert de Ros (died 1285), married Isabel d'Aubigny, had issue.
Peter de Ros
William de Ros (died about 28 May 1310), married Eustache FitzHugh, had issue.
Alexander de Ros
Herbert de Ros
John de Ros
Lucy de Ros
Alice de Ros, married John Comyn of Badenoch, had issue.

Citations

References
 

Year of birth unknown
Year of death unknown
13th-century English nobility
People from Helmsley
English feudal barons
Burials in North Yorkshire
De Ros family
English rebels
English prisoners and detainees
Prisoners and detainees of England and Wales